Japanese newspapers (or older spelling ), similar to their worldwide counterparts, run the gamut from general news-oriented papers to special-interest newspapers devoted to economics, sports, literature, industry, and trade. Newspapers are circulated either nationally, by region (such as Kantō or Kansai), by each prefecture, or by each city. Some newspapers publish as often as two times a day (morning and evening editions) while others publish weekly, monthly, quarterly, or even yearly. The five leading national daily newspapers in Japan are the Asahi Shimbun, Mainichi Shimbun, the Yomiuri Shimbun, Sankei Shimbun and the Nikkei Shimbun. The first two are generally considered liberal/left-leaning while the latter three are considered conservative/right-leaning. The most popular national daily English-language newspaper in Japan is The Japan Times.

The majority of the newspaper articles are printed vertically. Japanese law prohibits newspaper publishers to be publicly traded.

Brief history

The first modern newspaper was the Nagasaki Shipping List and Advertiser, which was published bi-weekly by the Englishman A. W. Hansard. The first edition appeared on 22 June 1861. In November of the same year, Hansard moved the paper to Yokohama and renamed it the Japan Herald. These two papers were published for foreigners, and contained only foreign news. The first Japanese daily newspaper that covered foreign and domestic news was the Yokohama Mainichi Shinbun (横浜毎日新聞), first published in 1871.

The early readers of these newspapers mostly came from the ranks of the former samurai class.

, on the other hand, were more plebeian, popular newspapers that contained local news, human-interest stories, and light fiction.

Throughout their history, Japanese newspapers have had a central role in issues of free speech and freedom of the press. In the period of growing militarism to the outbreak of total war in the 1930s to the 1940s, newspapers faced intense government censorship and control. After Japan's defeat, strict censorship of the press continued as the American occupiers used government control in order to inculcate democratic and anti-communist values. In 1951, the American occupiers finally returned freedom of the press to Japan, which is the situation today based on the Article 21 of the Constitution of Japan.

Reproductions of Japanese newspapers

These resources are available at many leading research universities throughout the world (usually universities with reputable Japanese studies programs). One will need to check each individual library's collection for information about the availability of these sources. WorldCat is a good starting point.

Yomiuri shinbun
In 1999, the  released a CD-ROM titled The  in the Meiji Era, which provides a searchable index of news articles and images from the period. Subsequent CD-ROMs, The Taisho Era, The Prewar Showa Era I and The Prewar Showa Era II, were completed eight years after the project was first conceived. Postwar Recovery, the first part of a postwar Showa Era series that includes newspaper stories and images until 1960, is forthcoming. Issues of  printed since 1998 are also available as an online resource through Lexis-Nexis Academic.

Asahi shinbun
The  has a CD-ROM database consisting of an index of headlines and sub-headlines from the years 1945–1999. A much more expensive full-text searchable database is available only at the Harvard-Yenching Library at Harvard University, which notably includes advertisements in its index. Researchers using other university libraries would probably have to first use the CD-ROM index, and then look into the microfilm or  versions. Microfilm versions are available from 1888;  versions are available from 1931. Issues of the  printed since August 1984 are available through Lexis-Nexis Academic.

Mainichi shinbun
Issues of the  printed since 27 March 1998, are available through Factiva.

Stance and circulation, only morning (2022)
Yomiuri : conservative, 6,860,000
Seikyo : Soka Gakkai Buddhist religious media, 5,500,000 (Nominal)
Asahi : center-left, 4,290,000
Chunichi Shimbun/Tokyo Shinbun : left, 2,320,000
Mainichi : center-left, social liberal, 1,930,000
Nikkei : economy, conservative, 1,750,000
Nikkan Gendai : left (tabloid), 1,680,000 (Nominal)
Nikkan Sports: 1,660,000 (Nominal)
Tokyo Sports : sports, 1,390,000 (Nominal)
Houchi Shinbun : sports, 1,350,000
Sankei Sports: 1,230,000
Yukan Fuji : right (tabloid), 1,050,000
Sankei : right, conservative, 1,020,000
Shimbun Akahata : Japanese Communist Party media, 1,000,000
Hokkaido Shinbun : left, 840,000
Daily Sports: 640,000
Shizuoka Shinbun : left, 537,000
Chugoku Shinbun : left, 510 ,000

See also
 List of newspapers in Japan

Notes

Further reading

Bibliography
  Bibliography]
 

 
 
 

17th-century establishments in Japan
Publications established in the 17th century

Lists of newspapers by language